Look Forward to Failure is an EP released on November 10, 1998 by The Ataris on Fat Wreck Chords. This was the first album released to feature fan favorite "San Dimas High School Football Rules", a song that would later appear on Blue Skies, Broken Hearts...Next 12 Exits.  The band also intended on putting the song "That Special Girl" on Blue Skies, Broken Hearts as well but it didn't make the cut. The song features Mark Hoppus of Blink-182 on backing vocals. The version of "My Hotel Year" that appears on this EP is the electric version and contains an extra verse at the end. The version that ended up on Blue Skies was acoustic and shortened.

Track listing

Band members
 Kris Roe – vocals, guitar
 Patrick Riley – guitar
 Michael Davenport – bass
 Chris Knapp – drums

Additional personnel
 Backup vocals were provided by Mark Hoppus and Chad Price.
 Tracks 2, 3, 4, and 6 were recorded and mixed at The Blasting Room in Fort Collins, CO on September 14–18, 1998.  They were produced and engineered by Bill Stevenson and Stephen Egerton and mixed by Jason Livermore.
 Tracks 1 and 5 were recorded at Orange Whip Studios in Santa Barbara, CA.  They were produced by Joey Cape and engineered by Angus Cooke.

References

The Ataris albums
1998 EPs
Fat Wreck Chords EPs
Albums produced by Bill Stevenson (musician)